The First League of Primorje-Gorski Kotar County or Prva županijska nogometna liga Primorsko-goranske županije (Croatian), or simply 1. ŽNL Primorsko-goranska, is the sixth level league in the Croatian football league system. The league was formed in 1992. First League of Primorje-Gorski Kotar County covers clubs from the Primorje-Gorski Kotar County. The winner is promoted to 4. HNL Rijeka.

Members for season 2018–19

Football leagues in Croatia